The Women's Challenge Cup is a rugby league knockout competition organised by the Rugby Football League. The competition started in 2012.

History

2012–2016: Foundations
The Women's Challenge Cup was set up in 2012 to run alongside the men's competition to give women's rugby teams more competitive games and to give the sport a bigger profile by attaching it to the Challenge Cup. Most teams in the first few years were community clubs and had no links to professional men's clubs. In 2014 the RFL set up an amateur league for the women's game, to help more women's teams get regular game time.

2017–present: Exposure
In 2018 the competition started to receive a much higher profile, with the final being broadcast live on the BBC Sport website.  In 2019 bookmakers Coral agreed to sponsor the competition – in addition to their sponsorship of the men's Challenge Cup – and it was also announced that the final of the 2019 Cup would be played as part of a triple-header with the semi-finals of the men's 2019 Challenge Cup at the University of Bolton Stadium on 27 July 2019.

Finals

Results

Sponsorship

See also

Challenge Cup
Wheelchair Challenge Cup

References

2012 establishments in England
Women's rugby league competitions in England
National cup competitions
RFL Women's Challenge Cup